Beth-Anath was  mentioned in the Bible as "one of the fenced cities that fell to the lot of Naphtali, and from which the Canaanites were not driven out."

Early history
Among the place names found in a list of Ramses II, Beth-anath remains the only name that clearly refers to the Galilee according to Judges 1:33.

Beth-Anath has been translated to mean "temple of Anat", a Canaanite goddess linked to a Sumerian predecessor called Ninhursag.

Beth-Anath continued to be settled by the native Canaanites, even after Israel's conquest of the land during the early Iron Age. The Zenon Papyri (mid 3rd-century BCE) mentions a certain estate belonging to Apollonius in Βαιτανατα (Beth-anath), a way-stop along the route traveled by the Zenon party as it passed through ancient Palestine. In the 2nd-century CE, Beth-Anath was considered a borderline village,  inhabited by both Jews and Gentiles.

Eusebius, in his Onomasticon, placed it  from Dora (Tanturah), however this falls outside the territory of Naphtali.

Identification  
Several places have been identified with Beth-Anath.

Aynata 

Aynata in Lebanon was suggested by van de Velde in 1854, by W.M. Thomson in 1859, and later Victor Guérin to be the ancient site of Beth-Anath. The same view was held by historical geographer Georg Kampffmeyer (1892).

Bi'ina 

Bi'ina in the Beit HaKerem Valley which divides Upper Galilee from the Lower Galilee was suggested by Ze'ev Safrai as being the biblical Beth-Anath, a view that had been established long before him, by a host of archaeologists and historical geographers: W.F. Albright, (1921/1922: 19–20); Neubauer (1868: 235–ff.); Abel (1928, pp. 409–415; 1938: 266); Alt (PJB 22, 1926, pp. 55–ff.; 24, 1928, p. 87); Saarisalo ("Boundary", p. 189); Rafael Frankel, et al. (2001:136); Aviam (2004:53); Reeg (1989:72–73). The site dates back to the Iron Age. Initially, Albright thought that Beth-Anath might be Tell Belat, but later changed his mind for the site at Bi'ina (Dayr al Ba'ana), based on the name given for the village in the Jerusalem Talmud (Orlah 3:7), and which more closely resembles the site's present name.

Albright conjectured that the ancient site of Beth-Anath was probably situated at the mound of Jelamet el-Bi'ina, less than a mile southeast of the present site of Bi'ina, a place surrounded by fertile fields. The word jelameh, meaning "hill" or "mound," is sometimes employed instead of tell. Israeli archaeologist Yoram Tsafrir remained undecided where to place Beth-anath, saying that it could have either been where is now Bi'ina, or where is now Bu'eine.

Bu'eine Nujeidat

Tsafrir et al.  suggested that Beth-Anath could be at Bu'eine Nujeidat, or Bi'ina.

Hinah 

Historical geographer Samuel Klein (1934:18–34 ) placed Beth-Anath in Hinah, a town on the southeast side of Mount Hermon. His view is supported by Grintz (1964:67), who cites Josephus (Antiquities 5.1.22) as corroborating Klein's view, insofar that Naphtali's territory is said to have extended as far as Damascus in the east.

Safad el-Battikh 

Aharoni (1957:70-74) held the view that Beth-Anath was to be identified with Safed el-Battikh, in the Bint Jbeil District. Aharoni cites Eusebius' Onomasticon and his mention of Batanaia being distant 15 miles from Caesarea, a place thought by Aharoni to refer to Cesarea Philippi (1957:73). According to him, this would put Batanaia (=Beth-Anath) in the vicinity of Safed el-Battikh.

See also
List of minor biblical places#Beth-anath

References

Bibliography

External links
 Jewish Encyclopedia (1906), Beth-Anath

Ancient villages in Israel
Former populated places in Israel
Canaanite cities
Biblical geography
Hebrew Bible cities
Former populated places in Lebanon
Anat